Bestia is a 2021 Chilean stop-motion animated short film directed by Hugo Covarrubias and co-written with Martín Erazo. The film won Best Animated Short Subject at the 49th Annie Awards. It also made the shortlist for Best Animated Short Film at the 94th Academy Awards, later achieving the nomination, becoming the second Chilean animated short film to be nominated for an Oscar after Bear Story in 2016, which won the award.

Synopsis
The main character is inspired by Íngrid Olderöck, a police major and DINA agent during the Chilean military dictatorship, responsible for human rights violations in that period. According to Covarrubias, the objective of the film is not a biography of Olderöck but a visit to her secret life, her relationship with her dog, her fears and frustrations, which are ultimately the x-ray of a country that is fractured, a country that it is full of wounds that are not even close to healing yet.

Release
The film screened at the 2021 Annecy International Animation Film Festival, where it competed in the Short Films section and won the Festival Connexion Award.

Production 
Bestia is the third animated short film directed by Hugo Covarrubias, after El almohadón de pluma (2007) and La noche boca arriba (2012). The idea arose with the intention of addressing part of the history of Chile "with lesser-known characters, less official and darker". Although the original objective was to produce an animated series, Covarrubias decided to focus on one of those stories to make a unitary short film.   

The technique used was stop motion animation, which was done by Covarrubias and Matías Delgado. The design of the protagonist was based on the aesthetics of porcelain dolls, to convey the inexpressiveness and coldness of the character. The character was created with polyurethane resin bathed in crystal resin, to give her face a texture similar to ceramic. Meanwhile, the sets and decorations were made with different opaque cardboards to create a contrast with the brightness of the resin.

The short film was produced by Tevo Díaz, through the company Trébol 3, while Cecilia Toro worked as a costume designer and art producer. Its financing came from the "Audiovisual Development Fund" of the Ministry of Cultures, Arts, and Heritage of Chile.

Accolades

References

See also
Independent animation
Arthouse animation
Cinema of Chile

External links
 
 Cartoon Brew article about said film
 Official trailer

2021 films
2021 animated films
2020s animated short films
2020s stop-motion animated films
Best Animated Short Subject Annie Award winners
Chilean animated short films
2020s Spanish-language films
Animated films about dogs
Zoophilia in culture